Ryan Cornelius is a British property developer. He was sentenced to ten years in prison for defrauding the Dubai Islamic Bank. After the completion of his sentence, it was extended by an additional 20 years  unless the 430 million dollar debt was settled.

References

Living people
Year of birth missing (living people)
British criminals